Pat Nebo is a Nigerian production designer as well as an art director. He worked as the production designer in films including October 1, "76, Being Mrs Elliot and Okafor's Law. He also worked as a set designer in few films.

In 1993, he started his career as a production designer with the home movie Ti Oluwa Ni Ile. In the same year, he worked in the two sequels of Ti oluwa ni ile. In 2009, he made maiden cinema appearance with the film The Figurine where he acted as the 'Marriage Registrar'. However, he continued to work as the production designer in several films such as Araromire, Arugba, Alero's Symphony and Being Mrs Elliot. 

Apart from production designing, he also worked as the art director in the films: The Figurine, Phone Swap, Half of a Yellow Sun and 76.

Filmography

References

External links
 

Living people
Year of birth missing (living people)
Nigerian entertainment industry businesspeople
Nigerian production designers